Herman Schueremans (born 5 January 1954) is a Flemish politician and concertpromotor. Schueremans was involved from the start with Rock Werchter and Torhout-Werchter. Now he still organises Rock Werchter for Live Nation, that bought the two festivals. From 2004 to 2012 he was also a member of the Flemish parliament for the Flemish Liberals and Democrats.

References

1954 births
Living people
Open Vlaamse Liberalen en Democraten politicians
21st-century Belgian politicians